Events from the year 1746 in Wales.

Incumbents

Lord Lieutenant of North Wales (Lord Lieutenant of Anglesey, Caernarvonshire, Denbighshire, Flintshire, Merionethshire, Montgomeryshire) – George Cholmondeley, 3rd Earl of Cholmondeley 
Lord Lieutenant of Glamorgan – Charles Powlett, 3rd Duke of Bolton
Lord Lieutenant of Brecknockshire and Lord Lieutenant of Monmouthshire – Thomas Morgan
Lord Lieutenant of Cardiganshire – Wilmot Vaughan, 3rd Viscount Lisburne
Lord Lieutenant of Carmarthenshire – vacant until 1755
Lord Lieutenant of Pembrokeshire – Sir Arthur Owen, 3rd Baronet
Lord Lieutenant of Radnorshire – William Perry
Bishop of Bangor – Matthew Hutton
Bishop of Llandaff – John Gilbert
Bishop of St Asaph – Samuel Lisle
Bishop of St Davids – The Hon. Richard Trevor

Events
The Wales and Berwick Act 1746 is passed by the Parliament of Great Britain.  It specifies that all future laws applying to England will also be applicable to Wales and Berwick-upon-Tweed.  It is finally repealed in its entirety by the Interpretation Act 1978.
William Edwards begins his first attempt at building a bridge over the River Taff at Pontypridd.
Construction of The Cathedral School, Llandaff, and the "Italian Temple", both designed by John Wood, the Elder, is completed.
Sidney Griffith joins the Methodist movement, after hearing a sermon by Peter Williams.

Arts and literature

New books
Anna Williams - Life of the Emperor Julian (translation from the French)

Music

Births
January - Thomas Totty, admiral (died 1802)
28 September - William Jones, philologist (died 1794)

Deaths
7 May - Sir Thomas Hanmer, 4th Baronet, politician and literary editor, 68
21 May - Lewis Morris, Welsh-descended Governor of New Jersey, 74

References

1746 by country
1746 in Great Britain